Mathiot is a surname. Notable people with this surname include:

Ginette Mathiot (1907–1998), French food writer and home economist
John Mathiot, American politician
Joshua Mathiot (1800–1849), American politician
Lorenzo Mathiot (born 1977), Seychellois footballer
Madeleine Mathiot (1927–2020), American linguist
Michel Mathiot (1926–1999), French gymnast
Télie Mathiot (born 1987), French pole vaulter
Ulric Mathiot, Seychellois footballer and manager

See also